The following is an incomplete list of paintings by the German painter and engraver Albrecht Dürer.

Sources
Wolf, Norbert. Albrecht Dürer. Prestel, 2010. 

 
Dürer, Albrecht